Histiogaster is a genus of mites in the family Acaridae.

Species
 Histiogaster bacchus Zachvatkin, 1941
 Histiogaster carpio (Kramer, 1882)
 Histiogaster ocellata Vitzthum, 1926
 Histiogaster silenus Zachvatkin, 1941

References

Acaridae